Metadon is a genus of hoverfly containing 43 species. Most of the species were originally described in the genus Microdon.

Species

M. achterbergi Reemer, 2013
M. aethiopicus (Rondani, 1873)
M. albofascia (Hull, 1944)
M. annandalei (Brunetti, 1907)
M. apicalis (Walker, 1858)
M. apis (Speiser, 1913)
M. appendiculatus (Curran, 1929)
M. aureomagnificus (Hull, 1944)
M. auricinctus (Brunetti, 1908)
M. auroscutatus (Curran, 1928)
M. bicolor (Sack, 1922)
M. bicoloratus (Hull, 1944)
M. bifasciatus (Matsumura, 1916)
M. brunneipennis (Huo, Ren & Zheng, 2007)
M. captum (Speiser, 1913)
M. erythrocephalus (Bezzi, 1915)
M. flavipes (Brunetti, 1908)
M. fulvicornis (Walker, 1858)
M. fulvipes (Meijere, 1908)
M. fuscicornis (Sasakawa, 1960)
M. fuscus (Meijere, 1908)
M. inappendiculatus (Curran, 1929)
M. inermis (Loew, 1858)
M. modesticolor (Hull, 1944)
M. montis (Keiser, 1958)
M. mydas (Bezzi, 1915)
M. mynthes (Séguy, 1953)
M. pallidus (Bezzi, 1915)
M. pendelburyi (Curran, 1931)
M. persicus Gilasian & Reemer, 2015
M. pingliensis (Huo, Ren & Zheng, 2007)
M. pretiosus (Curran, 1931)
M. punctulatus (Wiedemann, 1824)
M. robinsoni (Curran, 1928)
M. ruficaudus (Brunetti, 1907)
M. rugosus (Bezzi, 1915)
M. rutiliventris (Vockeroth, 1975)
M. rutilus (Keiser, 1952)
M. sacki (Goot, 1964)
M. spuribifasciatus (Huo, Ren & Zheng, 2007)
M. squamipennis (Brunetti, 1923)
M. taprobanicus (Keiser, 1958)
M. wulpii (Mik, 1899)

References

Hoverfly genera
Microdontinae